Laughs For Sale is an American television comedy/variety series. It ran one season.

Each episode provided an opportunity for a novice comedy writer to have material, including sketches, performed by a professional comedian. The material was then evaluated and offered to television producers, who could contact the show.

Notes

Sources 
Terrace, Vincent. "Laughs for Sale" in Encyclopedia of Television Shows, 1925 through 2007. Jefferson, North Carolina: McFarland & Co., 2008.

1960s American sketch comedy television series
1963 American television series debuts
1963 American television series endings
English-language television shows
American Broadcasting Company original programming